Harold Hering Knerr (September 4, 1882 – July 8, 1949) was an American comic strip creator, who signed his work H. H. Knerr. He was the writer-artist of the comic strip The Katzenjammer Kids for 35 years.

Born in Bryn Mawr, Pennsylvania, Harold Knerr's father was Calvin B. Knerr, a German physician who had migrated to the United States. His mother was Melitta Hering, daughter of Constantine Hering, a pioneer of homeopathy. After attending the Episcopal Academy, he studied for two years at the Pennsylvania Museum and School of Industrial Art and then became a newspaper illustrator. He recalled, "My first newspaper work was drawing pictures of gravestones atop the oldest graves in a local cemetery for The Philadelphia Record. These were paid for at the fee of three dollars each."

Comic strips

According to Knerr authority James Lowe, Knerr was extremely prolific, producing more than 1,500 Sunday comic pages between 1901 and 1914 for a half-dozen continuing features in three different Philadelphia newspapers.

He created his first comic strip, Zoo-Illogical Snapshots, for the Public Ledger. In 1899, when he was 18, he started working for The Philadelphia Inquirer. In 1901, he drew the Sunday strip, Willie's Revenge, followed by a number of comic strips, including the Mr. Jack-inspired Mr. George and His Wife (1904–14). In 1906, he took over the strip Scary William and continued it until 1914. From June 15, 1913 to November 15, 1914, he drew The Irresistible Rag. (The cartoonist Joe Doyle drew both Scary William and The Irresistible Rag after Knerr left these strips.)

From 1903 to 1914, he drew The Fineheimer Twins, an imitation of The Katzenjammer Kids, which made it obvious he was the ideal artist to replace Rudolph Dirks on The Katzenjammer Kids.

The Katzenjammer Kids
Knerr took over The Katzenjammer Kids Sunday strip in November 1914 when Dirks left the Hearst-owned New York Morning Journal after a legal dispute. 

During World War I, some newspapers retitled the strip as The Shenanigan Kids, and the nationality of the characters was changed to Dutch instead of German because of World War I anti-German sentiments. It changed back to its original name and contents in 1920. He continued to write and draw the strip until his death in 1949, when it was taken over by Charles H. Winner.

Knerr's continuation of The Katzenjammer Kids has been praised as "a particularly brilliant job... true to the spirit of the original, and yet stylistically his own."

Dinglehoofer und His Dog Adolph
On May 16, 1926, Knerr started  (sometimes titled  Dinglehoofer und His Dog Adolph during the early 1930s), a topper that accompanied The Katzenjammer Kids until two years after Knerr's death. By 1936, to avoid any association with Adolf Hitler, the dog's name was changed to Schnappsy.

Personal life
Knerr never married. In New York during the 1940s, he lived in the Hotel Blackstone at 50 East 58th Street. On July 8, 1949, he died in Manhattan from heart disease, survived by a sister in Carmel, California, and a brother in Philadelphia.  He is buried at West Laurel Hill Cemetery in Bala Cynwyd, Pennsylvania.

Bibliography
Zoo-Illogical Snapshots
Mr. George and His Wife (1904–14)
Hard Luck Bill (1903–04)
Die Fineheimer Twins (1903–14)
Scary William (1906–14)
The Irresistible Rag (1913–14)
The Katzenjammer Kids (1913–49)
Dinglehoofer und His Dog (1926–49)

Books of Katzenjammer Kids comics were produced in the 1930s, including Katzenjammer Kids in the Mountains (1934, Saalfield Publishing) and The Katzenjammer Kids (1939, Dell Publishing). In 1935, Whitman published Dinglehoofer und his Dog Adolph.

See also
The Katzenjammer Kids
List of American comics creators

References

External links
Lambiek

1882 births
1949 deaths
American comic strip cartoonists
University of the Arts (Philadelphia) alumni
American people of German descent
American male artists
The Katzenjammer Kids